Çaydeğirmeni is a belde (town) in Devrek district of  Zonguldak Province, Turkey. At  it is situated in the valley of Alpaslan creek, a tributary of Yenice River. The population of Çaydeğirmeni is 5130  as of 2010. The area around Çaydeğirmeni was inhabited from the 4th century BC. (late Hellenistic period) The settlement was a stop on an ancient caravan route. But the present town was founded in 1993 after a merger of two villages named Kemerler and Kaypaklar.

References

Populated places in Zonguldak Province
Towns in Turkey
Populated places in Devrek District